Enid is a fictional character in the  television series The Walking Dead. She was portrayed by Katelyn Nacon for five seasons, and was promoted to series regular in season 8.

Appearances

Season 5 

Enid is an Alexandria resident. She is first introduced to Carl sitting on a bed with a book while Ron and Mikey show Carl their video games. When Enid leaves the community, Carl pursues her and they form a connection.

Season 6 

She often sneaks out of the safe zone. Eventually, Carl follows her out, but she sneaks back in away from him. Ron explains to Carl that she arrived alone and that it took her a while to speak to the other kids. Carl continues to follow her outside, which she quickly realizes. Despite her uneasiness with him stalking her, she lets him accompany her as she keeps up the survival skills she used to travel before she arrived in Alexandria. Carl also seems to have developed a crush on Enid, but appears too timid to pursue it, given his resistance to even hold her hand for more than one second. Enid finally tells Carl that she is the last survivor of her family; they were attacked and only she came out safe, traveling alone until she came across Alexandria. The sentimental bond of Enid to Carl is developed, when Enid pleads with Carl to join the group on his journey to take Maggie to the Hilltop Colony for medical treatment. Carl refuses and locks her in the armory. Enid screams at Carl, asking what will happen if Carl and the others do not return. "Just survive somehow," he says, echoing her personal mantra.

Season 7

She helps Maggie during her pregnancy and wanted to go on the trip to the Hilltop Colony, but Carl traps her in a cupboard in fear of losing her. After learning of the deaths of Glenn and Abraham, Enid travels to the Hilltop with Carl. She and Carl share their first kiss and Enid begs Carl to not travel to the Sanctuary, but he doesn't give in. When at the Oceanside, Enid asks Carl what it's like to kill somebody, anticipating she will have to do it soon. In the Season 7 finale, Enid arrives at Alexandria with Maggie, Jesus, and the other Hilltop residents to join the battle against the Scavengers and the Saviors.

Season 8

Enid joins the others from Alexandria, Hilltop, and the Kingdom at the first assault on the Saviors at the Sanctuary. She accompanies Maggie back to Hilltop afterward. After Aaron arrives at the Hilltop with news of Eric's death, he decides they need to convince the Oceanside to join the fight against the Saviors. Enid convinces Aaron to let her go with him on the mission. Before entering Oceanside, Enid tells Aaron they need to bring them something they can use, and she finds a truck full of alcohol. They arrive at night so they decide to sleep in the car and meet with Natania and Cyndie in the morning. While they are sleeping they hear a noise and they get out of the car to investigate. Aaron is then attacked by Natania, but Enid shoots and kills her before she stabs him. Cyndie and the other women of Oceanside take Aaron and Enid prisoner. Cyndie decides to execute the two, but Enid talks her out of it and Cyndie lets them leave, but warns them to never come back. Aaron and Enid leave Oceanside. Aaron tells Enid he needs to stay and try to convince Cyndie to join the fight but she should leave and get back to Maggie and the Hilltop. Enid reluctantly leaves. After Enid returns to Hilltop, Daryl, Rosita, Tara, and the other Alexandrians tell Enid, Maggie, Carol, and Morgan of Carl's death. Enid collapses in tears and Maggie holds her. Enid is with Michonne, Maggie, and Rosita when they meet Georgie for the first time. Enid, still angry about Carl's death, argues with Michonne about what they should do with Georgie. Enid wants to take their stuff and kick the newcomer out. Michonne takes her gun and tells her to step back. In the finale of Season 8, Enid stays with Tara at the Hilltop to protect it if the Saviors attack. When Saviors do show up at Hilltop, Enid carries Judith to safety outside the walls. Aaron and the Oceanside show up and help defend the Hilltop.

Season 9 

During the year and a half that passed since the end of the war, Enid had become interested in medicine and has been learning under Siddiq. Enid and the group go to the Smithsonian in Washington D.C, to search for a covered wagon and farming equipment and during Gregory's plot to kill Maggie, Enid intervenes to defend her but her attempt was in vain when struck by Earl Sutton the blacksmith from Hilltop. Shortly after, Earl is imprisoned and Enid witnesses how Gregory is executed by hanging, in front of the entire Hilltop community. When Aaron injures his arm by a trunk that crushes him, Enid is shocked and horrified when Daryl rushes Aaron to the infirmary. She examines his injury and quickly decides they need to amputate. Aaron reluctantly agrees as Daryl ties the tourniquet. Enid gains confidence and amputates his arm. At night, when Rick visits Aaron, he thanks Enid for her help. Six years later, Enid becomes the Hilltop doctor and enters into a relationship with Alden.

In the episode "The Calm Before", Enid is murdered by Alpha, leader of the Whisperers group, alongside Tara and several others. Her undead severed head is found on a pike by Daryl, Yumiko, Michonne, and Carol after they discover a wounded Siddiq. In flashbacks, Enid is seen fighting the Whisperers with a knife and killing at least one as Siddiq recounts Enid's last moments.

Season 10 

Enid appears in Siddiq's PTSD flashback where he remembers Enid fighting in her final moments.

Development and reception 
Katelyn Nacon portrays Enid on The Walking Dead. Katelyn Nacon was promoted to main star billing status for season 9.
Enid's character development in season 9 received praise from critics, Fansided said of her: "Enid has always been such a great character on the show so it’s nice to see her finally getting more screen time and a bigger role in the show."

Her last appearance as a regular character on the show was in the season 9 episode "The Calm Before".

References

American female characters in television
Fictional American physicians
Fictional characters from Virginia
Fictional child soldiers
Fictional female medical personnel
Fictional murdered people
Fictional women soldiers and warriors
Fictional zombies and revenants
Teenage characters in television
The Walking Dead (franchise) characters
The Walking Dead (TV series)